Joshua Allison (born 27 March 1986) is a 1.0 point wheelchair basketball player from Australia. He played basketball for the Kilsyth Cobras and the Sherbroke Suns before suffering a serious accident in 2011. He began playing wheelchair basketball in 2013, and was selected for the national team (the Rollers) in 2014. That year he was part of the team that won the 2014 Incheon World Wheelchair Basketball Championship. In 2016, he represented Australia the 2016 Summer Paralympics in Rio de Janeiro.

Biography 
Joshua Allison was born on 27 March 1986. He has a Certificate III in bricklaying from the Holmesglen Institute of TAFE in Moorabbin, Victoria, and has three children named Keeley, Willow, Hudson. On 1 October 2011, he fell  through a hand rail at his home in Croydon, Victoria. He suffered severe injuries, including fractures in his neck and back, and crushing his spinal cord, rendering him paraplegic. The news came as a profound shock to his fellow players, who played a fund-raiser game for him on 5 February 2012.

During his rehabilitation, Allison took up wheelchair basketball in 2013, taking to the court to play for the Kilsyth Cobras once more, this time in the National Wheelchair Basketball League (NWBL) as a 1.0 point player. Wrist bands were sold, and a boot camp and an online auction held to raise money for an $8,000 basketball wheelchair. The Cobraswent on to win the NWBL championships in 2015 and 2016. He made his international debut with the Australia men's national wheelchair basketball team (known as the Rollers) in April 2014 in a tour of the Netherlands and Belgium. Later that year he was part of the Rollers team that won gold at the 2014 Incheon World Wheelchair Basketball Championship. In June 2016, he toured Great Britain for the 2016 Continental Clash against Canada, Great Britain, Japan, the Netherlands and the United States. The Rollers were defeated by the United States, and won silver. In 2016, he was selected for the 2016 Summer Paralympics in Rio de Janeiro.

He was one of five Rollers selected for their first Paralympics where they finished sixth.

References

External links

Basketball Australia Profile

1986 births
Paralympic wheelchair basketball players of Australia
Living people
Wheelchair basketball players at the 2016 Summer Paralympics
Sportsmen from Victoria (Australia)
People from Croydon, Victoria
Sportspeople from Melbourne